Macon Mall is a two level, 1.1 million square foot shopping mall located in Macon, Georgia. It is a dead mall with a 74% and rising vacancy rate with only one anchor store,  Burlington. It has three vacant anchors left by Belk, J.C. Penney and Macy's. Sears once occupied the space currently taken by Burlington. The lower level is still empty.

History

Early History (1975-1986)
The mall opened in 1975 as a 1.08 million square foot shopping mall anchored by Davison's, Belk, JCPenney, and Sears. A Woolworth was added later which went bankrupt. The opening of Macon Mall led to the demise of Georgia's first enclosed mall, Westgate Mall down the street. At opening date the mall was filled with hundreds of light bulbs in a disco-style theme. This appearance quickly became dated and expensive to maintain, leading to the mall's first renovation in 1983. The food court was added in 1986 and Davison's changed over to Macy's, when Macy's decided to rename all of their stores at the time under the same name.

Renovation and Expansion (1997)

For 14 years Macon Mall was one of the largest malls in the state of Georgia encompassing . The mall underwent a huge renovation and expansion in 1997 that nearly doubled the size of the mall and added Dillard's and Parisian as anchors. This made the mall more upscale and added 40+ new stores. This expansion made Macon mall the largest mall in the state of Georgia for two years until Mall of Georgia opened in 1999 in Gwinnett County. Two parking garages were constructed on the new wing to handle the increase in business and decrease in parking. An extra level was also added to the food court that brought in Atlanta Bread Company, Sbarro, and Time Out Arcade. Macy's changed over to Rich's in 1998. In the years following the expansion, Macon Mall ran a monopoly on regional retail. A new power center named Eisenhower Crossing opened down the street in 2001 and took Old Navy from the mall. Federated integrated Macy's into Rich's as Rich's-Macy's in 2003, and in 2005 announced they were eliminating all of their regional names in favor of Macy's in 2005. This resulted in Rich's at Macon Mall changing back to Macy's. Belk also dropped the "Matthews" name from their store and Steve & Barry's opened a large store on the upper level of the Sears wing in 2005.

Beginning of the Decline (2008)

Parisian was bought by Belk in 2006 and was closed in 2007. The mall entered foreclosure in 2008, and put under the operation of Jones Lang LaSalle.  In 2008, The Shoppes at River Crossing, a new lifestyle center, opened in North Bibb County and took Dillard's from Macon Mall. Dillard's stated they could better serve the market with one store, but their departure was speculated to be because of the mall's debt issues. With Dillard's gone, this leaves the two anchor stores added to the mall in 1997 vacant, and the mall performance began to deteriorate rapidly. This in turn created a ripple effect and many tenants began leave the mall in 2009, such as Abercrombie & Fitch, Ann Taylor Loft, Eddie Bauer, Hollister Co., The Gap, Charlotte Russe, GameStop, New York & Company, f.y.e., The Limited, Lane Bryant, Wolf Camera, Wet Seal, LensCrafters, Starbucks, and Ruby Tuesday. Some of these stores moved to The Shoppes at River Crossing, many left the Macon area entirely, and some closed due to corporate bankruptcies: Steve & Barry's, B. Dalton, Linens N Things, and KB Toys.  The Movie Tavern that was supposed to open in 2009, in the former Parisian building, never did due to the mall's financial issues. The upper level of the food court has been abandoned. This exodus of retailers is a direct result of Dillard's vacancy, new competition, poor location, and the weakened economy. In 2009, Macon Mall introduced Art Space. This is the second art space concept in a mall in the U.S. The first is Crestwood Court outside of St. Louis.

Renovation and Demolition (2011)

The mall continued to leak in-line tenants in 2010 including Express, Yankee Candle, Hot Topic, Chick-Fil-A, and Subway. In September 2010, the mall was acquired by Hull Storey Gibson of Augusta, Georgia. They planned to demolish the east wing of the mall beginning with the vacant Parisian building. The original and remaining portion of the mall, was renovated. The Art Space tenants in the 1997 addition were asked to vacate, while the remaining tenants were asked to move to the west wing. While many did (Rue 21, Finish Line, Spencer's) just to name a few, there were some who left the mall including American Eagle Outfitters, Victoria's Secret, and Sunglass Hut. Demolition began on August 15, 2011. Once demolition was complete, North Point Mall in Alpharetta outside Atlanta reliquinshed Macon Mall as 4th largest mall in Georgia. Macon Mall also signed off with a new restaurant called Smok’n Pig which is the largest tenant to sign with the mall. The Renovation was revealed on November 18 and 19 in a two-day celebration. Notable changes included the whole mall being carpeted, new skylights and ceilings, new restrooms, removal of the carousel, and the moving of staircases. They did not demolish the former Dillard's building. Demolition was completed by the end of 2011. On December 29, 2011, Sears announced that they would close the store at the Macon Mall due to a decline in sales at both Kmart and Sears stores nationwide. Sears' last day was Sunday, April 29, 2012. Belk closed its doors on Saturday, September 15, 2012, having opened a location at The Shoppes at River Crossing. For the next two years, vacancies steadily increased with stores like The Children's Place, RadioShack, Kirkland's, Ashley Stewart, Aéropostale, and Justice (formerly Limited Too) leaving the mall. Despite these closures, two stores opened in 2012: B. Turner's and Dry Falls Outfitters.

Continued decline (2012-2021)

Burlington Coat Factory confirmed that it would move into the upper level of the former Sears in 2015. In October 2015, Burlington Coat Factory opened in the top level of the former Sears as Burlington. On Friday, March 17, 2017, JCPenney announced that its store would be closing as part of a plan to close 138 stores nationwide. The store closed on Monday, July 31, 2017. Meanwhile, as of 2018 vacancies continue to increase with stores like Marks & Morgan Jewelers and Men's Wearhouse & Tux, closing as well as the food court steadily emptying out. On January 6, 2020, it was announced that Macy's would be closing in March 2020 as part of a plan to close 125 stores nationwide which would leave Burlington as the only anchor store left.

Redevelopment (2021-present)
On Wednesday, September 15, 2021, Macon-Bibb County announced that Hull Property Group had donated the mall to them and Mayor Lester Miller announced a $100 million dollar investment to redevelop the mall and add a new amphitheater. With this redevelopment, city officials are hoping this will result in new businesses coming to the Eisenhower Parkway corridor. The amphitheater will have seating for up to 10,000 and the mall will include new businesses, office space for the county, space for Central Georgia Technical College and Middle Georgia State University as well as space for the film industry. Plans are also in place to create the world's largest Pickleball facility in the area. Since the announcement of the redevelopment, several retailers have expressed interest in nearby shopping centers and the city announced plans for a Casino hotel as well as a new restaurant plaza called "Mac-Town".

List of anchor stores

References

 New Macon Mall Tenant Promises 150 Jobs
 Belk closing another hit for macon mall

External links
 Macon Mall official site

Shopping malls in Georgia (U.S. state)
Buildings and structures in Macon, Georgia
Tourist attractions in Macon, Georgia
Shopping malls established in 1975
Hull Property Group
1975 establishments in Georgia (U.S. state)